The motorcycle land-speed record is the fastest speed achieved by a motorcycle on land. It is standardized as the speed over a course of fixed length, averaged over two runs in opposite directions. AMA National Land Speed Records requires 2 passes the same calendar day in opposite directions over a timed mile/kilo while FIM Land Speed World Records require two passes in opposite directions to be over a timed mile/kilo completed within 2 hours. These are special or modified motorcycles, distinct from the fastest production motorcycles.

History

The first generally recognized motorcycle speed records were set unofficially by Glenn Curtiss, using aircraft engines of his own manufacture, first in 1903, when he achieved  at Yonkers, New York using a V-twin, and then on January 24, 1907 on Ormond Beach, Florida, when he achieved  using a V8 housed in a spindly tube chassis with direct shaft drive to the rear wheel. An attempted return run was foiled when his drive shaft came loose at speed, yet he was able to wrestle the machine to a stop without injury. Curtiss's V8 motorcycle is currently in the Transportation collection of the Smithsonian Institution.

The first FIM-sanctioned record to exceed Curtiss's 1907 speed did not occur until 1930, at Arpajon in France, when an OEC special with a 1,000cc supercharged JAP V-twin  engine averaged  over the required two-way runs. The 1930s saw an international battle between the BMWs ridden by Ernst Henne and various JAP-powered British motorcycles, with the penultimate pre-war record being taken in 1937 by Italy's Gilera, shortly before BMW set a final pre-war record of  that stood for 14 years.

After the Second World War, the German NSU factory battled Britain's Vincent HRD and Triumph for top speed honors during the 1950s, with British engined machines dominating the 1960s.

A Japanese-engined streamliner motorcycle first took the record in 1970, and alternated with Harley-Davidson-engined machines as record-holders until 1990, when Dave Campos's streamliner powered by twin Harley-Davidson engines averaged . The BUB team, using a custom-built V4 engine, then alternated as record holders with Ack Attack over the next four years. As of November 2022, the Ack Attack team has held the motorcycle land speed record at  since late 2010.

Jet-engine trike
The fastest record certified by the FIM is that set in 1964 by the jet-propelled tricycle, Spirit of America. While such records are usually validated by the Fédération Internationale de l'Automobile, the FIA only certifies vehicles with at least four wheels, while the FIM certifies two- and three-wheelers. Breedlove never intended Spirit of America to be classified as a motorcycle, despite its tricycle layout, and only approached the FIM after being rejected for record status by the FIA. Spirit of Americas FIM-ratified record prompted the FIA to add the new category of thrust-powered vehicles to its world record listings. Furthermore, most people think of the tricycle Spirit of America, now part of the permanent collection of Chicago's Museum of Science and Industry, as a car and not a motorcycle.

List of AMA National and FIM World Land Speed records
Link to Bonneville Motorcycle Speed Trials AMA National and FIM World Records

List of "absolute" and Streamliner records

Notes

a.  At the time, it had been the accepted practice that the F.I.M would require the American Automobile Association to carry out official timing for any run in the USA. However shortly before the record attempt the A.A.A. had withdrawn from controlling motor sport, leaving no official body representing the F.I.M.. Although every effort had been made to show the impartiality of the officials and the accuracy of the equipment, after several months the claimed record was not accepted by the F.I.A. as the timing was "not carried out by an official certified by the F.I.M.".

b.  The issues with official F.I.M. timing of runs in the USA were still not resolved at this time. NSU had solved the problem for their runs in August by including accredited timekeepers and officials in the team that they bought over with them from Europe. The British Motor Corporation had also been attempting record runs that year, and the F.I.A arranged for a British timekeeper to go to America for these. The equipment he had used for timing the runs was tested and approved by the F.I.A., however he had to leave America before Allen could make his run, and so the same equipment was used by two Americans who had been given written authority to act as timekeepers on behalf of the F.I.M. At the F.I.M meeting in Paris in October, the F.I.M. postponed approval of the record, alleging that the timekeeper was not recognised by the F.I.M. and that no official F.I.M. observer had been present. After further deliberation and investigation, the F.I.M. announced in April 1957 that they were unable to ratify the record claimed as the equipment used had not been approved by them.

References

Literature

See also
List of fastest production motorcycles

External links
 Bonneville Speed Trials
 BUB Motorcycle Speed Trials archive, predecessor to Bonneville Motorcycle Speed Trials
 The UK Land Speed Racing Association 

 
Land speed record
Motorcycle